"Stick to Your Vision" is the first single from Maestro's fifth album, Built to Last, released in 1998. Produced by 2Rude, the song contains a sample of "These Eyes" by The Guess Who. It became his first song to appear on Canadian charts since "Conductin' Thangs" in 1991.

Music video
The music video was directed by Little X. Most of the video was shot in Toronto's St. James Town neighbourhood, also featuring scenes in a hydro field.

Track listing

12" single
A-side
"Stick to Your Vision" (Radio Edit)
"Stick to Your Vision" (Extended Vision)

B-side
"Stick to Your Vision" (The Rudimental Remix) (featuring Glenn Lewis)
"Stick to Your Vision" (Acappella)

Chart positions

References

1998 singles
Maestro Fresh-Wes songs
Music videos directed by Director X
Songs written by Randy Bachman
Songs written by Burton Cummings
1998 songs